The Chick Corea Elektric Band is an album by jazz and fusion keyboard player Chick Corea, released in 1986. It is the eponymous debut album of the Chick Corea Elektric Band, which at that time also featured drummer Dave Weckl, bass player John Patitucci and guitarists Scott Henderson and Carlos Rios.

This album can be described as "jazz-rock", though it is much closer to traditional jazz than the jazz-rock albums of the 1970s. The keyboard sounds on the album are typical for the mid-1980s. The drums played by Dave Weckl dominate the album's sound, with the guitar duties split between Scott Henderson and Carlos Rios.

The album features a heavy use of FM synthesis, MIDI and drum programming, expanding on Corea's previous work in later lineups of Return to Forever and reflecting the technology of the time when it was conceived and recorded.

Track listing 
All songs by Chick Corea except where noted otherwise.

"City Gate" – 0:54
"Rumble" – 4:04
"Side Walk" (Chick Corea / Dave Weckl / John Patitucci) – 3:48
"Cool Weasel Boogie" – 6:43
"Got a Match?" – 5:38
"Elektric City" – 4:07
"No Zone" – 5:29
"King Cockroach" – 6:56
"India Town" – 5:06
"All Love" – 5:45
"Silver Temple" – 8:32
(Tracks #1, #10 & #11 were not included in the original issue of the album)

Personnel 
 Chick Corea – synthesizer programming, Fender Rhodes electric piano MIDI-ed to Yamaha TX816 rack-mount synthesizer units (1, 4, 6–8, 10, 11), Yamaha KX-88 MIDI keyboard/Yamaha TX816 rack-mount synthesizer units (1–3, 6–9, 11), Fairlight CMI (2, 3, 7), Synclavier (2–4, 7), Linn 9000 (2–4, 6, 7), Yamaha KX-5 keytar synthesizer controller/Yamaha TX816 rack-mount synthesizer units (5), Minimoog (6), Yamaha GS-1 (7), Yamaha DX7/Yamaha TX816 rack-mount synthesizer units (8, 9), gong (8, 9)
 Scott Henderson – guitars (1, 8, 11) 
 Carlos Rios – guitars (3, 4, 6)
 John Patitucci – Smith/Jackson six-string bass guitar (1, 5, 8, 9, 11), Fender Jazz four-string bass guitar (6, 8), Pollman acoustic/double bass (4, 7, 10)
 Dave Weckl – drums, Simmons electronic drums (1–3, 6, 7, 9), LinnDrum (1, 3, 7, 8, 9, 11), percussion (2)

Additional musicians
 Rory Kaplan – synthesizer programming, Fairlight CMI programming 
 Bo Tomlyn – DX voice creation
 Rhett Lawrence – LinnDrum consultant

Production 
 Chick Corea – producer 
 Dave Grusin – executive producer 
 Ron Moss – executive producer 
 Larry Rosen – executive producer
 Bernie Kirsh – associate producer, recording, mixing 
 Joe Hesse – recording manager 
 Larry Mah – assistant engineer 
 Ira Rubnitz – assistant engineer, mix assistant, overdubbing 
 Gary Wagner – assistant engineer 
 Bernie Grundman – mastering at Bernie Grundman Mastering (Hollywood, California)
 John Rusko – technician maintenance 
 Rory Kaplan – keyboard technician 
 Evelyn Brechtlein – project coordinator, studio manager 
 Julie Moss – project coordination assistant 
 Marc Meisenheimer – production manager 
 Mike Manoogian – cover logo
 Andy Baltimore – creative director, art design 
 David Gibb – art design 
 Dan Serrano – art design 
 John David Moore – black and white photography 
 Glen Wexler – color photography

Chart performance

References

External links 
 Chick Corea Elektric Band - The Chick Corea Elektric Band (1986) album releases & credits at Discogs
 Chick Corea Elektric Band - The Chick Corea Elektric Band (1986) album to be listened on YouTube

1986 debut albums
Chick Corea albums
Jazz fusion albums by American artists
GRP Records albums